Yuri Mansur (born 24 May 1979) is a Brazilian show jumping competitor. He represented Brazil at the 2020 Summer Olympics in Tokyo 2021, competing in individual jumping.

References

External links

1979 births
Living people
Brazilian male equestrians
Equestrians at the 2020 Summer Olympics
Olympic equestrians of Brazil
Brazilian show jumping riders
Sportspeople from São Paulo